HEAD STRONG: Fanelli 4 Brain Injury Awareness is an organisation formed for the purposes of increasing public awareness of brain injury and raising funds for the Brain Injury Association of Canada.

Background
In October 2009, OHL player of the Kitchener Rangers, Ben Fanelli took a devastating hit to the head from Erie Otters player Mike Liambas. Fanelli was taken to the hospital in critical condition with facial and skull fractures.  He survived from the accident. "It's a miracle for me to be able to walk into this room and put together sentences after what I went through," Fanelli says about the severity of his injury. After recovering from his injury, Fanelli eventually returned to the Kitchener Rangers for the 2011–2012 season.

In March  2011, Fanelli founded Head Strong: Fanelli 4 Brain Injury Awareness, with the backing of the Kitchener Rangers, in order to raise awareness of brain injury and to help and raise funds for the Brain Injury Association of Canada (BIAC). "Lance Armstrong overcame something that no one thought was possible and I want to replicate that in a different way with my injury," said Fanelli in an interview with BIAC.  Armstrong was Fanelli's inspiration and still remains one of his biggest idols. With the support of the Kitchener Rangers behind him Fanelli is collecting donations (which can be made online, or in person at the Kitchener Rangers Office), as well as selling HEAD STRONG T-shirts for $20 with proceeds going towards the Brain Injury Association of Canada.  Fanelli also stated that during the 2012-2013 hockey season, new Head Strong product would be sold at the Kitchener Auditorium.

Fanelli's contributions and support
From the start of Head Strong, this organization quickly became just as big a passion to Fanelli as hockey was. Fanelli continues to play hockey in the OHL and while doing all he can to continue spreading the word about Head Strong: Fanelli 4 Brain Injury Awareness.  Two of Fanelli's teammates, Gabriel Landeskog and Ryan Murphy, helped contribute to Fanelli's recovery and fully supported him during his tough times. On June 5, 2011 Fanelli kicked off the first event of his organization by participating in a triathlon in Milton, ON in order to raise funds of which pledges donated went towards BIAC. For this event, his teammates assisted him to train; "I am the vocal guy out there that keeps him going – Gabe is the guy who can work out with him. But we do our part and can't wait to see him running, swimming and biking," said teammate Ryan Murphy about Fanelli's triathlon training. As well, many public events in support of Head Strong and the Kitchener Rangers can be found around Ontario and are free to attend to raise awareness about brain injury and brain injury in sport. "A concussion is a brain injury now and is common in my sport, hockey," Ben states. "I want to make it known that there is a way to help."

Future
He has hopes that eventually Head Strong: Fanelli 4 Brain Injury Awareness will be as well known an organization and fund as that of his
idol's Livestrong by Lance Armstrong. As Head Strong quickly approaches the organization's two-year anniversary in March 2013, there has been
tremendous support from dozens of hockey players, hockey icon Don Cherry to Prime Minister Stephen Harper and many other figures.

Fanelli continues to spread the word about Headstrong to raise awareness about brain injuries and donations towards BIAC.  He doesn't play in the OHL anymore. Just Beer League with some beauties.

References

Neurology organizations
Medical and health organizations based in Ontario
2011 establishments in Ontario
Ontario Hockey League